Ice sledge speed racing at the 1988 Winter Paralympics consisted of twelve events, eight for men and four for women.

Medal summary

Men's events

Women's events

References 

 

 
1988 Winter Paralympics events
1988